Wayne Munn (February 19, 1896 – January 9, 1931) was an American professional wrestler and collegiate football player from the University of Nebraska. As a wrestler, Munn was a World Heavyweight Champion. His world title win is historic as it was the first time that a pure performer (as opposed to a legitimately skilled wrestler) had won a world championship in professional wrestling.

Wrestling career
His fame from playing football attracted the attention of wrestling star, Ed Lewis and promoters Toots Mondt and Billy Sandow, who prematurely pushed Munn as the next big star in the sport. Munn won the World title from Lewis in 1925, despite his limited wrestling and shooting (out of ring performing) ability. This backfired on Lewis and his camp, as Munn subsequently lost the title to Stanislaus Zbyszko in a famous double-cross (shoot), as Zbyszko legitimately pinned Munn, despite agreeing to lose to him prior to the match. Munn, unable to defend himself against Zbyszko's holds, was beaten decisively. Munn held the title for a little over three months.

Munn went into retirement shortly afterwards, and spent some years in the oil business, before his death from kidney problems at the Fort Sam Houston base hospital in San Antonio, Texas on January 9, 1931. He was survived by his wife and a daughter, Mary Ann Munn.

Munn had also served as an infantry first lieutenant during World War I.

Championships and accomplishments
National Wrestling Association
World Heavyweight Championship (Catch as Catch Can version) (1 time)

References

Further reading
Beekman, Scott. Ringside: A History of Professional Wrestling in America. Westport, Connecticut: Greenwood Publishing Group, 2006. 
Greenberg, Keith Elliot. Pro Wrestling: From Carnivals to Cable TV. Minneapolis: Lerner Publications, 2000. 
Hornbaker, Tim. National Wrestling Alliance: The Untold Story of the Monopoly that Strangled Pro Wrestling. Toronto: ECW Press, 2007.

External links
Wayne Munn Wrestling History at LegacyofWrestling.com
Wayne Munn at OnlineWorldofWrestling.com

1896 births
1931 deaths
American male professional wrestlers
Deaths from kidney disease
Nebraska Cornhuskers football players
Professional wrestlers from Kansas
People from Colby, Kansas
Professional wrestlers from Nebraska
20th-century professional wrestlers